For the Castle of Wewelsburg see Wewelsburg

The German Wewelsburg town  is part of the Büren (Westphalia) city in Paderborn district since a local government reform in 1975. The village is placed above the Alme brook and surrounds the "Wewelsburg" castle (the same name as the village) from north, east and south.

External links
 The town of Wewelsburg 

Villages in North Rhine-Westphalia
Paderborn (district)